Bennetts Corners is an unincorporated community in Medina County, in the U.S. state of Ohio.

History
A post office called Bennetts Corners was established in 1863, and remained in operation until 1904. The community was named for one Mr. Bennett, an early settler.

References

Unincorporated communities in Medina County, Ohio
Unincorporated communities in Ohio